In the 1991 Cameroonian Premier League season, 16 teams competed. Canon Yaoundé won the championship.

Overview
It was contested by 16 teams, and Canon Yaoundé won the championship.

League standings

References
Cameroon - List of final tables (RSSSF)

Cam
Cam
1
Elite One seasons